Lucius is a survival horror video game developed by Finnish studio Shiver Games and published by Lace Mamba Global for Microsoft Windows. The game is centered on the 6-year-old-boy Lucius, the son of Lucifer, who murders members of his household, using powers of telekinesis and mind control to orchestrate deadly accidents that lead to the deaths of multiple residents of Dante Manor. A sequel, Lucius II: The Prophecy, was announced on 8 August 2014, and was released in February 2015. A second sequel, Lucius III, was announced on 27 August 2018 and released on 13 December 2018.

Plot 
On the night of 6 June 1966, Lucius Wagner is born. Meanwhile, a satanic cultist performs a ritual, causing a shadowy figure to reach the room in which Lucius was born. Lucius' childhood is spent in the luxurious manor house on the private estate of his father, Charles Wagner and his wife, Nancy, was as normal as every kid's young years, excluding the extreme wealth of his parents. Unbeknownst to young Lucius, part of his family's wealth comes from his grandfather, Fabius, who had ties with the mob. After celebrating on the night of his sixth birthday, he is visited by Lucifer, who instructs him to lock a maid in the freezer after everyone else has gone to bed. While Lucius is asleep, he is once again visited by Lucifer, this time revealing himself to be Lucius's true father. Before sending him off, he gives Lucius a task: as part of a debt the family owes, Lucius must kill everyone who resides in the manor. The next morning, a detective, McGuffin, and a deputy are sent to investigate the death.

Over the next few months, Lucius carefully picks off the manor's inhabitants through both everyday household objects and a small roster of supernatural powers that he gains over time. Each death is constructed to look like an accident. The poisoning of one of the manor's inhabitants leads to further investigation. Catching his uncle Tom having an affair with one of the housemaids, Lucius plants false evidence that pits the blame on another maid, Jovita. Staging her death as a suicide, Lucius then kills an alcoholic and repressed Tom by poisoning one of his bottles using a vial hidden in a satanic ritual room located behind the manor's wine cellar. Charles begins to have suspicions of Fabius after he vehemently refuses to attend Tom's funeral. McGuffin, having been sent away by a grieving Charles, confesses to his sins and sends two priests to the manor. Fabius sends the priests away and knocks out a journalist who had broken into the manor for a scoop on the deaths. Realizing Lucius' true calling, he awakens Lucius and the two sneak off to the wine cellar where he plans on sacrificing the journalist. Deducing that Fabius is no longer necessary for him to complete his mission, Lucius betrays Fabius by stabbing him the back, his blood filling the bowls on the table instead of the journalist's. The journalist, no longer unconscious, battles
Lucius but is killed by him—using his newfound pyrokinetic abilities.

In the aftermath of both deaths, McGuffin finds himself in hot water over the journalist's disappearance and a worried Charles stumbles upon a book detailing his father's satanic rituals. Piecing together that his father had a much darker past than he led on, Charles theorizes that Lucius has become cursed as a result of Fabius' actions. As he tries to find evidence to prove this to a mentally-unstable Nancy, Lucius plants a nail-gun and forces him to kill her using his supernatural powers as McGuffin and his deputy arrive on the scene. Charles pits the blame on Lucius and runs away. McGuffin gives chase and Lucius is put into the care of McGuffin's deputy. After Lucius kills him with a ceiling fan, he manages to set the manor ablaze with a fireball. As the manor is quickly engulfed in flames, Charles returns with the two priests that McGuffin originally sent to fend off Lucius.

Should Lucius assault all three at once, he will crush Charles to death with a pillar and meet McGuffin (face to face) as he leaves the manor. Should he, instead, choose to pick them off one at a time, he will nearly be killed by Charles. McGuffin, arriving on the scene, kills Charles before he can lower a Fire Extinguisher on Lucius's head. McGuffin leaves the manor with Lucius, still clueless of the fact that Lucius was responsible for all of the deaths, setting up the events for Lucius II: The Prophecy.

Reception 

Lucius received "mixed or average" reviews according to review aggregator Metacritic. Gaming website GameSpot said "the biggest problem is a lack of information; tips are given [...] but the core aspects of the game are not explained well". In a negative review, Adventure Gamers stated that "much of the writing and voice acting is mediocre at best". RPGFan said in a review that playing the game felt "like testing a gameplay idea rather than a fully finished title".

References

External links

2012 video games
Indie video games
Stealth video games
Single-player video games
Windows games
Windows-only games
Psychological horror games
Video games about children
Child characters in video games
Video games about demons
Fiction about the Devil
Video games about birthdays
Video games set in 1972
Video games set in 1973
Video games developed in Finland